The Viareggio Synagogue is a centre for Jewish religious devotions located
at Vicolo degli Oleandri 30 (30 Oleander Lane), within the religious
oversight of the Jewish Community of Pisa.

History 
Between the end of the 19th century and the start of the 20th century, many Jewish
families moved to Viareggio, mostly from nearby Leghorn. The scrolls of the
Sefer Torah, still preserved in the synagogue at via degli Oleandri,
goes back to that period.

In the 'thirties the congregation, made up of 52 families, rented a location
in Viareggio's via Fratti, to be set up as a centre for worship. Here, in
1940, forllowing the Fascist race laws, a Jewish school was opened as well.
With the Nazi occupation in 1943, school and synagogue ceased to exist.

Only in 1955 was the current synagogue opened, thanks to various private
donations.

In Viareggio there is also a small Jewish cemetery.

References 

Viareggio
Judaism in Italy
Synagogues in Italy
Buildings and structures in Pisa